Lee O'Connor may refer to:

 Lee O'Connor (comics) (born 1982), British illustrator and comics artist
 Lee O'Connor (footballer) (born 2000), Irish professional footballer